Marius Ciugarin (born 20 November 1949) is a Romanian former footballer who played as a defender.

Honours
Steaua București
Cupa României: 1969–70, 1970–71
New York Croatia
Cosmopolitan Soccer League: 1985–86

References

External links
Marius Ciugarin at Labtof.ro

1949 births
Living people
Romanian footballers
Association football defenders
Liga I players
Eerste Divisie players
Super League Greece players
Cosmopolitan Soccer League players
FC Sportul Studențesc București players
FC Progresul București players
FC Steaua București players
FC Brașov (1936) players
FC Dordrecht players
Makedonikos F.C. players
Romanian expatriate footballers
Expatriate soccer players in the United States
Romanian expatriate sportspeople in the United States
Expatriate footballers in the Netherlands
Romanian expatriate sportspeople in the Netherlands
Expatriate footballers in Greece
Expatriate sportspeople in Greece
Romanian expatriates in Greece
Romanian expatriate sportspeople in Greece
Footballers from Bucharest